Alexis Lloyd (born in 1961) is a French film writer, director and producer best known for his film 30 Beats. He was managing director of Pathé UK.

Education and early career 

Lloyd studied literature at the Ecole normale supérieure de Saint-Cloud (1981-1984) and public affairs at the Institut d’Etudes Politiques de Paris (Sciences Po) and Ecole nationale d'administration (1986-1988). He holds a Master in Literature and a Master in Law. He served as a civil servant with the Inspection générale des finances (France) from 1988 to 1992 and taught foreign affairs at the Institut d’Etudes Politiques de Paris (Sciences Po).

Lloyd is the co-author with Antoine Winckler of L'Europe en Chantier published in 1993 by Éditions du Seuil that covers the history of the European Union. He also authored a number of op-ed articles on foreign affairs for the French daily newspaper Libération.

Pathé UK 

In 1993, Lloyd began working on film acquisition and development with Claude Berri, Paul Rassam and Jake Eberts, then on film sets as assistant director in Australia and New York. He moved to London in 1994 to run Guild Entertainment, an independent film distributor, then launched and became managing director of Pathé UK. At Pathé UK, Lloyd supervised the distribution operation, Pathé Distribution, and the production arm, Pathé Pictures, which won one of the three film franchises awarded by the Arts Council of England in May 1997.

During his years at Pathé UK, Lloyd was the executive producer of The Claim, It Was An Accident, There's Only One Jimmy Grimble, Love's Labour's Lost, and The Darkest Light.

As head of Guild Film Distribution and Pathé Distribution, Lloyd oversaw the co-production and distribution of over 90 feature films, including box office hits Stargate, Austin Powers, The Fifth Element, Sleepy Hollow, All About My Mother, The Blair Witch Project, Memento, and Chicken Run. Under his direction, Guild Entertainment and Pathé UK acquired and distributed independent films such as Bound, Basquiat, Swingers, The Spanish Prisoner, Pi, and The Virgin Suicides.

Writer, director, producer 

In 2001, Lloyd moved to New York to work as a writer, director and producer. His short film Indiscretion (101), shot in New York in 2001, was selected at the Palm Springs Film Festival and broadcast by France 2. His second short Le 10ème Jour was filmed in 2003 in Paris and also broadcast by France 2. His screenplay Octane was part of the 2008 eQuinoxe script selection.

In 2011, Lloyd wrote, directed and produced 30 Beats, his first feature. The film was shot in New York with an ensemble cast including Ingeborga Dapkūnaitė, Paz de la Huerta, Jennifer Tilly, Vahina Giocante, Condola Rashad, Justin Kirk, Thomas Sadoski, Lee Pace, Jason Day, and Ben Levin. 30 Beats was distributed in the US by Roadside Attractions/Lionsgate and in France by Orange Studio, a subsidiary of France Telecom. The financing for the film was structured as a co-production between Latitude 49 Production (a French company) and a group of foreign and American private investors. 30 Beats was produced by Molly Conners, Carl Kwaku Ford and Lloyd, with music composed by C.C Adcock. It was released theatrically in the US on July 20, 2012.

Filmography

Bibliography 

1993: L'Europe en Chantier (with Antoine Winckler), Éditions du Seuil,

References 

The Curious Comforts of a YouTube Show About Therapy
IN “GROUP,” THERAPY IS A BLEND OF ENTERTAINMENT AND EDUCATION
NYT Review of 30 Beats
Roadside Attractions Grabs Rights to Alexis Lloyd's '30 Beats'
Roadside Goes for Sexy Drama '30 Beats' Starring Paz de la Huerta
Lloyd ankles top U.K. Pathe post
PATHE OPENS DOOR
Lottery spins U.K. film arm on new Pathe
THREE WINNING TICKETS: UK lottery franchises go to Pathe, DNA and Film Consortium

External links 

1961 births
Living people
French film directors
French film producers
French male screenwriters
French screenwriters